Principal axis may refer to:

 Principal axis (crystallography)
 Principal axis (mechanics)
 Principal axis theorem

See also
 Aircraft principal axes
 One of the two principal axes of a hyperbola
 Optical axis
 The highest-order symmetry axis of a molecule, based on its molecular symmetry